The 2014 Georgia State Panthers football team represented Georgia State University (GSU) in the 2014 NCAA Division I FBS football season. The Panthers were led by second year head coach Trent Miles and played their home games at the Georgia Dome. The 2014 season was the Panthers' second in the Sun Belt Conference and the first season they were eligible to compete for the Sun Belt title and post season play at the FBS level. They finished the season 1–11, 0–8 in Sun Belt play to finish in last place.

Coaching staff

Schedule

Game Summaries

Abilene Christian

Sources:

New Mexico State

Sources:

Air Force

Sources:

Washington

Sources:

References

Georgia State
Georgia State Panthers football seasons
Georgia State Panthers football